Radio Active is a radio station based in Ystad Sweden. Founded in 1995, it broadcasts in FM on a frequency of 103.9 MHz, as well as online.

External links
 Radio Active

Radio stations in Sweden
Mass media in Ystad